Armando López (1903 – death date unknown) was a Cuban pitcher in the Negro leagues and Cuban League in the 1920s.

A native of Santa Clara, Cuba, López made his Negro leagues debut in 1923 with the Cuban Stars (East), and played with the Stars again the following season. He also played in the Cuban League for the Leopardos de Santa Clara.

References

External links
 and Baseball-Reference Black Baseball stats and Seamheads

1903 births
Date of birth missing
Year of death missing
Place of birth missing
Place of death missing
Cuban Stars (East) players
Leopardos de Santa Clara players
Cuban expatriates in the United States
People from Santa Clara, Cuba